Berfin Altan (born 24 November 2003)  is a Turkish  goalball player having visual impairment. She was a member of the national team  at the 2021 IBSA European Goalball Championship.

She is a high school student at the School for the Blind and Visually Impaired "Durmuş Ali Çoban Anadolu Lisesi" in Denizli, Turkey. She is a member of the school goalball team.

After playing chess and performin Judo, she
switched over to goalball in 2016. She has been called up to the Turkey women's national goalball team camps since 2018. She took part at the 2021 IBSA Goalball European Championship held in Samsun, Turkey. She enjoyed her team's silver medal title.

Honours

International
  2021 IBSA Goalball European Championship in Samsun, Turkey.

References

2003 births
Living people
Sportspeople from Denizli
Turkish blind people
Female goalball players
Turkish goalball players
21st-century Turkish sportswomen